The International School Augsburg (ISA) is an English-speaking private all-day school in Gersthofen, a town near Augsburg. As an “IB World School” the ISA belongs to a worldwide network of international co-educative schools which offer the International Baccalaureate (IB Diploma) in English. 
Established in 2005, the ISA is the only international school within an area of around 60 kilometres around Augsburg. In school year 2011/2012, 320 students were taught by 50 teachers from more than 15 nations.

History 
The agglomeration Augsburg (Regio A³) and the metropolitan area of Munich are two of the largest business locations in Bavaria with a large number of international companies having their seats there. For local companies an international school is an important site factor in the competition for foreign specialists and executives.
Therefore, the ISA was established with the support of the IHK Schwaben (International Chamber of Commerce in Swabia) and opened in 2005 for its first school year. The location of choice was Gersthofen, situated 15 minutes from downtown Augsburg, 30 minutes from Munich and having good access to transport.
In 2005, 65 children started their first school year in preschool (Early Learning Centre), Lower School (grade 1 to 5) and the first year of Middle School (grade 6). In 2010, the first class took their International General Certificate of Secondary Education exams (IGCSE) and in the following school year 2010/11 the High School was set up. In school year 2017/18, 342 students from more than 26 nations were enrolled in the ISA. In 2018, the seventh class took their International Baccalaureate exams (IB Diploma).

Campus: the buildings 
In 2005, the school moved into the first bricks-and mortar-built building in Ziegeleistraße. In 2008, when the school continued to grow, a gym and additional class rooms had to be built. In the year 2009 the new building, which is heated and supplied with power by a gas-fired cogeneration power plant, could be opened to the students. In 2012, the campus was enlarged by a third building. The ISA students have a playing field, a gym, a school-owned woodland, a school canteen, music rooms, a computer lab, a Mac lab, and a science room as well as school buses at their disposal.

Curriculum and projects

Curriculum 
The curriculum of the ISA is based on the guidelines of the International Baccalaureate Organisation IBO and is developed in close collaboration with other international schools and the Bavarian Ministry of Education. It offers, also to German children, a good foundation for their future education. The school offers an Early Learning Centre (3 – 5 years of age), a Lower School (grade 1 to grade 5), as well as a Middle School (grade 6 to grade 10), and a High School (grade 11 and grade 12). In the 10th grade, the students take their IGCSE (International General Certificate of Secondary Education) exams, in grade 12 students sit for International Baccalaureate Diploma exams. If certain criteria are met, both certificates are recognised worldwide and in Bavaria through the “Zeugnisanerkennungsstelle“ as the German “Mittlere Reife“ or “Allgemeine Hochschulreife”, respectively. The language of instruction is English. Where possible, in addition to German, the foreign languages French, Spanish, and the native language of the students are also taught. By special EAL (English as additional language) classes, the English level of children with a different linguistic background shall be converged in different steps to the level of their grade. German is taught throughout all grades. At ISA, special focus is given to art, music and media/IT. The teachers are selected from around the world in accordance with the requirements of Bavarian school authorities.

Projects 
Special projects which are not laid down in the curriculum are the non-profit CAS (Creativity, Action, Service) Project, in which students from grade 11 can participate both in community service programmes and environmental projects, for example a project aiming at using recycled paper or the campaign “Recycle, Reduce, Reuse”. Moreover, students take part in outdoor programmes or the drama group. The music programme includes weekly lessons, the school choir, instrumental lessons and the school orchestra. Concerts are held on a regular basis, in order to give students the necessary chances to perform.

Cooperations, associations, public relations 
In 2005, the “Student Council“was established. The association “Friends of ISA” was founded in 2005. It helps the school to purchase additional quality teaching material and to undertake school-related projects, like e.g. trips which support the students’ education. The ISA publishes a yearbook (annually) and a weekly newsletter.

Accreditations and memberships 
 2017: IB-PYP-Reauthorisation
 2016: Member of the consortium of International Schools in Bavaria (AISB)
 2012: CIS / NEASC accreditation
 2010: Authorization to offer the diploma programme of the International Baccalaureate Organization (IB World School)
 2009: IB PYP Authorization (IB World School)
 2008: Member of the Council of International Schools (CIS), recognised Cambridge Examinations Centre (IGCSE)
 2005: Member of the Association of German International Schools (AGIS)
 2005: Authorization as state-approved alternative school (“Ersatzschule”) in grade 1 to 9, Arbeitsgemeinschaft Internationaler Schulen in Deutschland e.V. (AGIS), New England Association of Schools and Colleges (NEASC).

References

External links 
 Official website of the International School Augsburg
 association „Friends of ISA" (Freunde der International School Augsburg ISA e.V.)“
 Bildungsportal Stadt Augsburg
 Official website of the International Baccalaureate Organisation
 Official website of the Council of International Schools (CIS)
 Official website of the Association of German International Schools (AGIS)
 Official website of the consortium of International Schools in Bavaria (AISB)

2005 establishments in Germany
Augsburg (district)
Educational institutions established in 2005
Cambridge schools in Germany
International Baccalaureate schools in Germany
Private schools in Germany
Schools in Bavaria
International schools in Germany